Mark Wystrach (born December 17, 1979) is an American  country music musician and actor. He is the lead singer of the country band Midland.

Biography
Wystrach, a native of Sonoita, Arizona, attended Salpointe Catholic High School in Tucson, Arizona from 1994 to 1998. Wystrach proposed to his girlfriend Ty Haney on May 28, 2019. Wystrach and Haney got married on October 8, 2019. On November 21, 2019, they welcomed a baby girl Sundance "Sunny" Leon. On December 5, 2021, they welcomed a baby boy. His sister, Alex Flanagan, is a sports journalist that has worked for multiple networks.

Acting and modelling career
Wystrach played the role of Fox Crane on the NBC soap opera Passions from 2006–2007 before the show moved to DirecTV in September 2007. He had a cameo role in CSI: Miami (season 6, episode 11). He played Nolan and Vic Fraiser, aka Kamen Rider Wrath, in the television series Kamen Rider: Dragon Knight. In 2017, Wystrach took the title role in the movie Johnny Christ. 

He also portrayed country singer Gary Paxton in the 2021 film, The Eyes of Tammy Faye.

He was also signed to IMG Models as a model.

References

External links

1979 births
American male soap opera actors
Living people
Male actors from Tucson, Arizona
21st-century American male actors
American male television actors
American country singer-songwriters
American male models
IMG Models models
21st-century American singers
Country musicians from Arizona
American country guitarists
Singer-songwriters from Arizona